Eschatological Scatology is the seventh full-length studio album by Gnaw Their Tongues, independently released on June 6, 2012.

Track listing

Personnel
Adapted from the Eschatological Scatology liner notes.
 Maurice de Jong (as Mories) – vocals, instruments, recording, mixing, mastering, cover art

Release history

References

External links 
 
 Eschatological Scatology at Bandcamp

2012 albums
Gnaw Their Tongues albums